For village in same West Godavari district, Tadepalligudem Mandal, see Madhavaram, Tadepalligudem. Other uses, see Madhavaram (disambiguation)

Madhavaram, is a village in Kukkunoor Taluk of Eluru district of the Indian state of Andhra Pradesh. It was in Khammam district, until the formation of Telangana state on 2 June 2014.

Demographics

References 

Villages in West Godavari district